The 2011 Tampa Bay Buccaneers season was the franchise's 36th season in the National Football League and the third and final under head coach Raheem Morris. The team competed in the NFC South. Both of their preseason home games, and seven of their regular season home games were played at Raymond James Stadium in Tampa, Florida. One regular season home game (October 23) was played at Wembley Stadium in London as part of the NFL International Series

Tampa Bay had high hopes for 2011. The team had not qualified for the playoffs since 2007, and that they attempted to build upon their success from the previous season. In 2010, Tampa Bay had finished with a 10–6 record, but lost out on tiebreakers and failed to make the playoffs. With the youngest head coach, and the youngest roster in terms of average age, in the league, and with anxious optimism, head coach Raheem Morris nicknamed the team "youngry." A close loss to Detroit on opening day was followed by a three-game winning streak and a fairly respectable 4–2 start with wins against division opponents Atlanta and New Orleans. Tampa Bay was in a tie for first place in the NFC South in mid-October. However, self-inflicted troubles started affecting the season, leading to a ten-game losing streak to finish the season. After the 4–2 start, the team did not win another game. Turnovers, penalties, and poor defense began taking its toll. Quarterback Josh Freeman's threw 22 interceptions (second-worst in the league), more than triple his total from 2010. The once dominating Tampa Bay defense ranked 30th in the league in total yards.

Statistically, the Buccaneers defense was among the worst in the league in 2011. Tampa Bay allowed the most points in the league (494), the most yards per play (tied at 6.3), most yards per pass attempt (tied at 7.6), the most rushing yards (2,497) and the most rushing touchdowns (26). They also allowed the second most yards per attempt (5.0), the second most rushing first downs (135), the third most total yards (6,311) and fourth most total first downs (356) of all teams in 2011.

Offseason

2011 draft board

After finishing the 2010 season 10–6 and narrowly missing the playoffs, the Buccaneers had the 20th overall pick in the 2011 NFL Draft.  A provision in the now expired collective bargaining agreement ensured that the draft still take place, despite the current lockout and lack of a new CBA.

Draft notes

Roster changes
Sources:   as of 09/28/2011 2:00 p.m. EDT
 Clubs are allowed 90 active players at the opening of training camp.
 Clubs must cut rosters to 80 active players by August 30.
 Clubs must cut final rosters to 53 active players by September 3.

Players re-signed

 Ronde Barber
 Quincy Black
 Jeremy Trueblood
 Davin Joseph
 Adam Hayward
 Michael Bennett
 Demar Dotson
 Tim Crowder
 Frank Okam (cut)
 Micheal Spurlock
 Elbert Mack
 Corey Lynch
 James Lee
 Connor Barth
 E. J. Wilson (IR)

Players signed

 Michael Koenen
 Devin Holland
 Zac Diles
 Raymond Webber (IR)
 Zack Pianalto (claimed off waivers)
 Chris Riley (claimed off waivers)
 Albert Haynesworth (claimed off waivers)
 Matt Clapp
 Collin Franklin
 Swanson Miller
 Nic Grinsby
 Daniel Te'o-Nesheim

Players released/losses

 Carnell Williams (StL)
 Barrett Ruud (Ten)
 Maurice Stovall (Det)
 John Gilmore (Pit)
 Quintin Borders
 Josh Jasper
 Doug Worthington (Wash)
 Mike Coughlin
 Aaron Feld
 Deonte Jackson
 Victor Aiyewa
 Jose Cruz
 Brandon Carter
 Aundrae Allison
 Vince Anderson
 Brandon Gilbeaux
 Detron Lewis
 Robert Malone (Det)
 Jock Sanders
 Ashton Youboty
 Rendrick Taylor
 Tyrone McKenzie (Min)
 Kyle Moore (Det)
 Armando Allen (Chi)
 John Malecki
 Matt Allen
 Cory Brandon
 Thomas Claiborne
 Jonathan Crompton (Wash)
 Marc Dile
 Daniel Hardy
 Dominique Harris
 Brandon Heath
 Simoni Lawrence
 Alex Magee
 Nathan Overbay
 Maurice Price
 Ryan Purvis
 Nick Reveiz
 Jacob Rogers
 Al Woods (Det)
 D. J. Johnson (Min)
 Scott Albritton
 Ross Homan
 Will Barker (Mia)
 Allen Bradford (Sea)

Practice Squad

 Chris Riley
 Ahmad Black
 Rudy Carpenter
 Collin Franklin
 Ed Gant
 Nic Grinsby
 Swanson Miller
 Matt Clapp

Injuries/reserve lists
 Andrew Economos was placed on the PUP list (Sept. 3); he was re-activated November 4.
 Cody Grimm suffered damage to the MCL in his right knee (week 3) and was placed on injured reserve.
 Running back Earnest Graham was placed on injured reserve after suffering a torn Achilles tendon during the game against Chicago.
 Gerald McCoy was placed in injured reserve with an arm injury (November 7)

Selected staff and personnel
 Head coach Raheem Morris – Club exercised two-year contract extension (fired January 2, 2012)
 General manager Mark Dominik – Four-year contract extension
 Pat Morris named offensive line coach.
 Keith Millard named defensive line coach.
 Grady Stretz named defensive line coach.

Preseason

Schedule

 On March 21, 2011, Aqib Talib was arrested and charged with aggravated assault with a deadly weapon following an incident in Garland, Texas, in which Talib and his mother allegedly shot at a man. On August 23, Talib met with NFL commissioner Roger Goodell regarding possible game suspensions regarding his charge. On August 27, it was announced that Talib would not be suspended for any games.

Regular season

Schedule
The Buccaneers' regular season schedule was announced April 19. Tampa Bay played Chicago at Wembley Stadium in London, England, on October 23 as part of the NFL International Series, with Tampa Bay serving as the host team.

The team's Ring of Honor induction ceremony took place during the December 4 game against Carolina. The team honored Jimmie Giles at halftime, and wore their orange throwback uniforms.

LEGEND:
 Indicates that the Buccaneers wore their white jerseys at home.
 Orange indicates designated throwback game.

Game summaries

Week 1: vs. Detroit Lions

Detroit scored two touchdowns in the second quarter, and led Tampa Bay 27–13 late in the game. Josh Freeman suffered through some cramping issues, but rallied the Buccaneers to score a touchdown with under four minutes remaining. The subsequent onside kick failed, but the Buccaneers were able to get the ball back in the final two minutes. Freeman drove Tampa Bay to the Lions 42-yard line in the closings seconds, but they were unable to score.

Week 2: at Minnesota Vikings

Minnesota led Tampa Bay 17–0 at halftime, but the Buccaneers rallied for the 24–20 victory on the road. In the final four minutes, Josh Freeman drove the Buccaneers 61 yards in 9 plays, capped off by a game-winning 4-yard touchdown run by LeGarrette Blount with 35 seconds remaining.

Week 3: vs. Atlanta Falcons

Tampa Bay led Atlanta 16–13 with 1:49 remaining. The Buccaneers faced 4th down & 1 at the Atlanta 44-yard line. The Falcons had no timeouts remaining, and were looking to get the ball back for one last drive. Josh Freeman and the Buccaneers lined up for the fourth down play, and the Falcons flinched on the hard count. The Falcons were penalized 5 yards for Offsides, the Buccaneers received a first down, and were able to run the clock out the secure the victory.

Tampa Bay snapped a 5-game losing streak to their division rivals, and coach Raheem Morris won his first game against Atlanta.

Week 4: vs. Indianapolis Colts

Tampa Bay hosted the winless Indianapolis Colts on Monday Night Football. Miscues and penalties nearly cost the Buccaneers control of the game, but Josh Freeman threw for 287 yards, and LeGarrette Blount rushed for 127 yards, as Tampa Bay won the game 24–17. Curtis Painter started at quarterback for the Colts, his first career NFL start.

The Colts led early after an Adam Vinatieri field goal. Tampa Bay then sacked Painter and recovered the fumble. Connor Barth's field goal attempt, however, bounced off the upright, and the score remained 3–0. Late in the first quarter, Freeman connected to Arrelious Benn, who ran 62 yards for an apparent touchdown. However, the touchdown was nullified since Benn has stepped out-of-bounds before the catch (illegal touching).

In the second quarter, the Buccaneers pinned the Colts at their own 2-yard line. Painter threw to Pierre Garçon, who ran for an 87-yard touchdown, and 10–0 lead. Tampa Bay answered with a touchdown, and trimmed the score to 10–7. In the final seconds of the first half, Freeman drove the Buccaneers to the Colts 19-yard line, but was sacked with 20 seconds to go and counting. The field goal unit hurried on to the field, and the field goal was initially good. Tampa Bay, however, was penalized for 12 men on the field, and the score was nullified.

Tied 17–17 in the fourth quarter, Tampa Bay received a punt with just under 7 minutes remaining. LeGarrette Blount blasted for a 35-yard touchdown run, and a 24–17 Tampa Bay lead. In the final three minutes, Tampa Bay ran out the clock, including a "4th & Inches" quarterback sneak by Freeman, to seal the victory.

This was Tampa Bay's first appearance on Monday Night Football since 2008, and the first home Monday night game since 2003. This MNF telecast was notable in that Hank Williams, Jr.'s "All My Rowdy Friends" opening was omitted due to comments he made on Fox & Friends earlier in the day where he compared a golf outing involving Barack Obama, John Boehner, Joe Biden, and John Kasich to "Hitler playing golf with Netanyahu."

Week 5: at San Francisco 49ers

Josh Freeman threw two interceptions (one returned for a touchdown), as Tampa Bay was routed 48–3 at San Francisco. Tampa Bay was held to only 86 yards rushing, had three turnovers, and suffered 9 penalties for a total of 96 yards.

Week 6: vs. New Orleans Saints

Josh Freeman threw for 303 yards and two touchdown passes, as Tampa Bay rebounded from the previous week, and beat divisional rival New Orleans by a score of 26–20. Drew Brees threw three interceptions, and the Saints lost a fumble, and Tampa Bay scored 10 points off of turnovers.

Trailing 26–20 midway through the fourth quarter, Brees drove the Saints to the Tampa Bay 4-yard line. On 4th down & 2 with 3:24 remaining, Brees was intercepted in the endzone by Quincy Black. The Buccaneers ran out the clock, and preserved the win.

Week 7: vs. Chicago Bears

Tampa Bay hosted Chicago at Wembley Stadium in London, England, their second time participating in the NFL International Series. Josh Freeman threw four interceptions, and Tampa Bay lost one fumble for five total turnovers. Chicago stretched out to a 21–5 lead before the Buccaneers staged a rally in the fourth quarter. Freeman threw two touchdown passes and the deficit was trimmed to 24–18 in the final two minutes. Freeman drove the Buccaneers to the Chicago 39-yard line, but the comeback was thwarted when he was intercepted with 37 seconds left.

Running back LeGarrette Blount was inactive due to injury, and Earnest Graham left the game in the first quarter due to an ankle injury. Third-string running back Kregg Lumpkin was left to handle rushing duties, but managed only 15 yards.

Week 9: at New Orleans Saints

New Orleans jumped out to a 24–6 lead, behind Drew Brees' 258 yards passing and 195 combined rushing yards. However, Tampa Bay tried to rally in the fourth quarter. Josh Freeman threw a touchdown pass to Kellen Winslow with 5:33 to go. The Saints, however, were able to run out the clock, and kicked a game-icing field goal to win 27–16.

Week 10: vs. Houston Texans

Tampa Bay lost their fourth game out of the last five, falling to Houston by the score of 37–9. On the first play of the game, Matt Schaub completed a pass to Jacoby Jones, who proceeded to go for an 80-yard touchdown. In the second quarter, Arian Foster had a 78-yard touchdown reception from Schaub, and the Texans were in control of the game throughout. Josh Freeman threw three interceptions, two of which led to touchdowns for Houston.

Week 11: at Green Bay Packers

Josh Freeman threw for 342 yards and two touchdowns, but Tampa Bay fell to Green Bay by a score of 35–26. With 4:25 remaining Tampa Bay scored a touchdown to trim the deficit to 28–26. An onside kick failed, and Green Bay took over. Green Bay iced the game with a touchdown with 2:55 to go.

Undefeated Green Bay improved to 10–0 on the season, and avoided the scare by the Buccaneers. Tampa Bay dropped to 4–6, losing to the Packers for the first time since 2003 and losing at Lambeau Field for the first time since 2001, the last year both teams were rivals in the former NFC Central division.

Week 12: at Tennessee Titans

Tampa Bay and Tennessee combined for 9 turnovers on a rainy, sloppy afternoon. Chris Johnson ran for 190 yards, but Tampa Bay led 17–10 late in the fourth quarter.

Trailing 23–17, Josh Freeman drove Tampa Bay to the Tennessee 25-yard line in the final minute. Facing a 4th down and 1, Freeman tried a QB sneak, but fumbled the snap due to the wet ball. He was tackled for a loss, the Buccaneers turned the ball over on downs, and the Titans held on to win.

Week 13: vs. Carolina Panthers

Josh Freeman sat out due to injury, and Josh Johnson started at quarterback. Tampa Bay wore their throwback uniforms, and honored Jimmie Giles at halftime. Cam Newton ran for three touchdowns (setting an NFL single-season record for rushing touchdowns by a quarterback) as Carolina routed Tampa Bay 38–19.

Week 14: at Jacksonville Jaguars

Quarterback Josh Freeman returned to the lineup and Tampa Bay jumped out to a 14–0 lead in the first quarter. However, Jacksonville scored 41 unanswered points to win 41–14. Maurice Jones-Drew scored a franchise-best four touchdowns (two rushing, two passing).

Tampa Bay committed seven turnovers in the loss. In the second quarter, Preston Parker fumbled a punt return, which was recovered by Colin Cloherty for an 8-yard touchdown. With the score 14–7, Freeman was sacked at his own goal line, fumbled, and Nate Collins recovered the ball in the end zone for a touchdown. Four plays later, Freeman was intercepted, which led to another Jacksonville touchdown. The Jaguars scored 28 points in the second quarter in a span of only 7:32.

At 4–9, Tampa Bay clinched a losing season, and was officially eliminated from playoff contention.

Week 15: vs. Dallas Cowboys

Tampa Bay hosted Dallas on Saturday Night. Dallas jumped out to a 28–0 halftime lead. Tony Romo threw for three touchdown passes, and ran for another. The Buccaneers tried to rally, but fell far short, losing 31–15.

Week 16: at Carolina Panthers

On Christmas Eve, Cam Newton broke the NFL record for most rookie passing yards in a season. Carolina routed Tampa Bay for the second time this season, by a score of 48–16.

Week 17: at Atlanta Falcons

Atlanta jumped out to a 42–0 lead by the second quarter. Ronde Barber played in his franchise record 225th game, despite suffering an injured hand, for which he sat out the second half. With the loss, Tampa Bay ended the season with ten consecutive losses, finished with a record of 4–12, last in the NFC South, and head coach Raheem Morris was fired the next day.

Standings

Staff

Final roster

Awards and milestones
 Week 3: Ronde Barber — NFC Defensive Player of the Week

Television blackouts

Preseason
Both of Tampa Bay's home preseason games were blacked out on local television because they failed to sell out prior to 72 hours before kickoff. The affiliates affected include WTSP in the Tampa/St. Pete market, WFTV in the Orlando market and WFTX in the Fort Myers area. The game was shown instead in tape delay. The game was aired live on WTLH in Tallahassee since it falls outside the designated 75-mile blackout radius.

Dating back to 2010, Tampa Bay has had four consecutive preseason home games blacked out.

Regular season
Tampa Bay's week 1 game against Detroit and week 3 game against Atlanta failed to sell out, and were blacked out locally. Tampa Bay was the only NFL team to face a blackout in week 1. The FOX affiliates affected were WTVT in the Tampa/St. Pete market and WOFL in Orlando.

Dating back to 2010, Tampa Bay had ten consecutive regular season home games blacked out. The blackout streak ended in week 4, when the Buccaneers hosted the Colts on Monday Night Football. The game was carried live on ESPN and simulcast on WFTS.

The blackouts returned in week 6 with the game against New Orleans. Tampa Bay's week 7 game against Chicago in London was not subject to blackout, regardless of sellout status. The week 10 game against the Texans was blacked out, affecting
WTSP and WKMG. The final blackout of the season occurred against Carolina in week 13. The final home game of the season against Dallas on December 17 sold out, and aired locally on NFL Network and simulcast on WTTA.

References

External links
 Buccaneers.com – Official site
 Pewter Report
 BUCPOWER

Tampa Bay Buccaneers season
Tampa Bay Buccaneers
21st century in Tampa, Florida
Tampa Bay Buccaneers seasons